Fuzzy classification is the process of grouping elements into fuzzy sets whose membership functions are defined by the truth value of a fuzzy propositional function. A fuzzy propositional function is analogous to an expression containing one or more variables, such that when values are assigned to these variables, the expression becomes a fuzzy proposition.

Accordingly, fuzzy classification is the process of grouping individuals having the same characteristics into a fuzzy set. A fuzzy classification corresponds to a membership function  that indicates the degree to which an individual  is a member of the fuzzy class , given its fuzzy classification predicate . Here,  is the set of fuzzy truth values, i.e., the unit interval . The fuzzy classification predicate  corresponds to the fuzzy restriction " is a member of ".

Classification
Intuitively, a class is a set that is defined by a certain property, and all objects having that property are elements of that class. The process of classification evaluates for a given set of objects whether they fulfill the classification property, and consequentially are a member of the corresponding class. However, this intuitive concept has some logical subtleties that need clarification.

A class logic is a logical system which supports set construction using logical predicates with the class operator { .| .}. A class

C = { i | Π(i) }

is defined as a set C of individuals i satisfying a classification predicate Π which is a propositional function. The domain of the class operator { .| .}  is the set of variables V and the set of propositional functions PF, and the range is the powerset of this universe P(U) that is, the set of possible subsets:

{ .| .} :V×PF⟶P(U)

Here is an explanation of the logical elements that constitute this definition:
 An individual is a real object of reference.
 A universe of discourse is the set of all possible individuals considered.
 A variable V:⟶R is a function which maps into a predefined range R without any given function arguments: a zero-place function.
 A propositional function is "an expression containing one or more undetermined constituents, such that, when values are assigned to these constituents, the expression becomes a proposition".

In contrast, classification is the process of grouping individuals having the same characteristics into a set. A classification corresponds to a membership function μ that indicates whether an individual is a member of a class, given its classification predicate Π.

μ:PF × U ⟶ T

The membership function maps from the set of propositional functions PF and the universe of discourse U into the set of truth values T. The membership μ of individual i in Class C is defined by the truth value τ of the classification predicate Π.

μC(i):=τ(Π(i))

In classical logic the truth values are certain. Therefore a classification is crisp, since the truth values are either exactly true or exactly false.

See also
 Fuzzy logic

References

Fuzzy logic